is a Japanese manga written and illustrated by Yasuyuki Ōno. A live action film based on the manga was released in 2012.

Cast
 Anna Ishibashi
 Shunya Shiraishi
 Kaya Asano
 Yui Ueta
 Satsuki Okada
 Yoshinobu Yamada
 Michie Kita
 Miyoko Ōmomo

References

External links
 Official film website 

1987 manga
Manga adapted into films
Shōnen Gahōsha manga
Seinen manga
Japanese romantic fantasy films